Jazmine Franks (born 20 February 1992) is a British actress and powerlifter best known for playing Esther Bloom in Hollyoaks from 2011 to 2018.  She is also notable for her role as teenager Kirsty in the 2006 miniseries Johnny and the Bomb.  She has also appeared as Jane Morris on the ITV miniseries The Second Coming, on the Channel 4 comedy-drama series Shameless and on the BBC One drama The Street.

Whilst in Hollyoaks, Franks was involved in a highly publicised storyline where her character was bullied by her classmates.  The soap worked with several charities to ensure the storyline was portrayed accurately.  In 2018, Franks opted to leave the serial and Esther departed on 30 April 2018. 

She is also a competitive powerlifter, winning 4th place in bench press on 2019 European Classic Bench Press Championships (-52kg wight class).

References

External links
 

1992 births
British actresses
Actresses from Lancashire
People from Bury, Greater Manchester
English television actresses
English soap opera actresses
Living people